John Patrick Llewellyn (born 7 August 1957) is a British fencer. He competed at the 1980, 1984 and 1988 Summer Olympics. He was a five times British fencing champion, winning the épée title at the British Fencing Championships in 1981, 1988, 1991, 1992 and 1994.

References

1957 births
Living people
British male fencers
Olympic fencers of Great Britain
Fencers at the 1980 Summer Olympics
Fencers at the 1984 Summer Olympics
Fencers at the 1988 Summer Olympics
Sportspeople from Winnipeg